The 2018–19 season of the Norwegian Premier League, the highest bandy league for men in Norway.

Eighteen games were played, with 2 points given for wins and 1 for draws. Stabæk won the league, whereas Konnerud were relegated and Høvik survived a relegation playoff.

League table

References

Seasons in Norwegian bandy
2019 in bandy
2018 in bandy
Band
Band